Manuel de Lambertye (born 16 March 1884, date of death unknown) was a French sports shooter. He competed in the team clay pigeon event at the 1924 Summer Olympics.

References

External links
 

1884 births
Year of death missing
French male sport shooters
Olympic shooters of France
Shooters at the 1924 Summer Olympics
Sportspeople from Madrid